Francis Reinhard (born May 20, 1944) is a retired Swiss professional ice hockey player who played for HC La Chaux-de-Fonds in the National League A.  He also represented the Swiss national team at the 1972 Winter Olympics.

References

External links

1944 births
Living people
HC La Chaux-de-Fonds players
Ice hockey players at the 1972 Winter Olympics
Lausanne HC players
Olympic ice hockey players of Switzerland
Swiss ice hockey forwards